Crean is a hamlet in west Cornwall, England, United Kingdom. It is situated three miles (5 km) east of Land's End.

References

Hamlets in Cornwall